Conversations-Lexikon or Konversations-Lexikon may refer to:

 Conversations-Lexikon mit vorzüglicher Rücksicht auf die gegenwärtigen Zeiten,  a German language encyclopedia published between 1796 and 1808
 Brockhaus Enzyklopädie, successive editions of the Conversations-Lexikon encyclopedia
 Meyers Konversations-Lexikon, a major German language encyclopedia from 1839 to 1984